Joseph D'Acquisto (born October 30, 1960) is an American retired professional wrestler. He is best known for his appearances with World Championship Wrestling from 1996 to 1998 under the ring name Roadblock (also spelled Road Block).

Professional wrestling career

Early career (1987–1996)
D'Acquisto debuted on October 28, 1987. He competed in New England and East Coast independent promotions during the 1980s and 1990s, most notably as a mainstay of International World Class Championship Wrestling, where he wrestled as "The Rochester Roadblock". In 1990, D'Acquisto was the subject of an article by journalist Glen Duffy published in Rolling Stone. In 1991 he made some appearances in the World Wrestling Council in Puerto Rico.

In 1992, D'Acquisto made several appearances with the Japanese W*ING promotion, where he feuded with Jason the Terrible. He would also wrestle for the Universal Wrestling Association in Mexico, where he competed under the masked gimmick of "Torre Infernal" ("Infernal Tower"). D'Acquisto's final match in the UWA was a mask versus mask match against UWA World Heavyweight Championship El Canek, which Canek would win.

World Championship Wrestling (1996–1998) 
During the late 1990s, D'Acquisto competed as a preliminary wrestler for World Championship Wrestling (WCW) as "Roadblock". In keeping with his ring name, D'Acquisto would carry a roadblock or a sawhorse to the ring. Roadblock made his televised debut in WCW on the October 19, 1996 episode of Saturday Night by defeating Dale Wolfe, a replacement for D'Acquisto's originally scheduled opponent Randy Savage. After the match, Roadblock challenged Lex Luger to a match to take place two nights later on Monday Nitro, which Acquisto lost. He made his only pay-per-view appearance in WCW at World War 3 on November 24 by participating in the namesake battle royal for a future World Heavyweight Championship opportunity. He was eliminated by the eventual winner The Giant. Roadblock spent the next two years in WCW working mainly on WCW Saturday Night, WCW Pro, and WCW Monday Nitro against the likes of Meng, Chris Benoit, The Giant, Lex Luger, Jim Duggan, and Diamond Dallas Page. Roadblock defeated Jim Powers in his last WCW match on the August 1, 1998 episode of Saturday Night.

Late career (1998–2012)
After leaving WCW in 1998, Roadblock appeared sporadically on the independent circuit, wrestling his final match to date in 2012.

Championships and accomplishments 
Eastern States Wrestling
Eastern States Heavyweight Championship (1 time)
Pro Wrestling Illustrated
Ranked No. 199 of the 500 top wrestlers of the PWI 500 in 1991

Luchas de Apuestas

References

External links
 
 

1952 births
American male professional wrestlers
Living people
Professional wrestlers from New York (state)
20th-century professional wrestlers
21st-century professional wrestlers